The 2003 South Dakota tornado outbreak, known locally as "Tornado Tuesday", was a tornado outbreak that occurred in the southeastern and east central part of South Dakota in the United States on June 24, 2003. At the time, this outbreak tied a United States record for the most tornado touchdowns in a single day for one state, with 67. The event was part of a larger outbreak that produced 125 tornadoes. However this record was surpassed by a tornado outbreak in Kansas on May 23, 2008 when 73 tornadoes hit the state, including two that started in Oklahoma. It was also the largest tornado outbreak ever recorded in the astronomical summer period that was not related to a tropical cyclone.

Confirmed tornadoes

Manchester, South Dakota

The most powerful tornado was located around Manchester in Kingsbury County and was rated an F4 on the Fujita scale. In the National Weather Service survey released shortly after the tornado, winds were estimated to be up to 260 miles per hour. There, every single structure was either heavily damaged or destroyed. Trees were debarked and all three homes were swept away. No fatalities were reported with this tornado, but at least 4 people were injured by the storm. Manchester was never rebuilt and is now a "ghost town" with some farm buildings but otherwise no houses or stores. Researchers had placed several sensors all across the area that was hit by the tornado. The twister passed right over one of the sensors which recorded a 100 millibar pressure drop. One film shot showed the tornado passing directly over a camera placed and buried on the ground.

Other tornadoes

Most tornadoes across South Dakota during that day were weak F0's and F1's; however, many caused extensive damage to farms and crops. One tornado tore through the Turner County Fairgrounds in Parker, destroying many structures at the site.

In Minnesota, several tornadoes touched down near the Buffalo Lake area with one of the storms causing extensive damage to the town. No tornado-related fatalities were reported during the entire day; however, tornadoes on June 22 and 23 killed two people in Nebraska.

During a four-day period from June 21 to June 24, the entire area from Wyoming to Minnesota was hit by a total of 125 tornadoes including 2 F4s.

See also
List of North American tornadoes and tornado outbreaks

References

External links
 Southeastern South Dakota tornado tracks (NWS Sioux Falls)
 Images of the Manchester tornado

F4 tornadoes by date
South Dakota
Tornadoes of 2003
Tornadoes in South Dakota
2003 natural disasters in the United States
2003 in South Dakota
June 2003 events in the United States